Moslem Eskandar-Filabi (born 26 March 1944) or Eskandar Filabi is a retired Iranian heavyweight wrestler who won four gold medals at the Asian Games in 1966-1974. Filabi also competed at the 1968, 1972 and 1976 Summer Olympics with the best result of fourth place in 1972; he served as the flag carrier for Iran at the 1976 Games.

References

External links
 

Wrestlers at the 1968 Summer Olympics
Wrestlers at the 1972 Summer Olympics
Wrestlers at the 1976 Summer Olympics
Iranian male sport wrestlers
1944 births
Living people
Asian Games gold medalists for Iran
Asian Games medalists in wrestling
Wrestlers at the 1966 Asian Games
Wrestlers at the 1970 Asian Games
Wrestlers at the 1974 Asian Games
Medalists at the 1966 Asian Games
Medalists at the 1970 Asian Games
Medalists at the 1974 Asian Games
Olympic wrestlers of Iran
People from Quchan
20th-century Iranian people
21st-century Iranian people